Pogue Creek or Pogues Creek is a small stream in west-central Barry County, Missouri. Pogue Creek starts just south of Butterfield and it flows west under Missouri Route 37 and on past Burtonville to join Shoal Creek east of Wheaton. 

Pogue Creek has the name of Marion Pogue, a settler.

See also
List of rivers of Missouri

References

Rivers of Barry County, Missouri
Rivers of Missouri